The McLaren M10 was a Formula 5000 race car chassis built by McLaren that competed in North America and Europe between 1969 and 1973.

Design

The McLaren M10 was manufactured in large numbers. Built close to the weight limit, it was very light and was powered by a 500+ hp Chevrolet V8 engine. The cars were not manufactured by McLaren itself, but by the British racing car manufacturer Trojan. Trojan was able to complete and deliver 17 of the originally ordered quantity of 50 vehicles.

Racing history

The M10 was the only Formula 5000 racing car to win the North American Formula 5000 Championship twice. In 1970, John Cannon won the championship with four race wins. A year later, Briton David Hobbs won the championship with victories at Seattle, Road America, Laguna Seca, Edmonton, and Lime Rock.

The M10 was also used in the European Formula 5000 Championship. In the first season of this series, Peter Gethin won the championship title with an M10 fielded by Church Farm Racing.

References

External links

McLaren racing cars
Formula 5000 cars